was a Japanese long-distance runner who is credited by the International Association of Athletics Federations for setting a world record in the marathon on March 31, 1935.

He was one of marathon runners dispatched to 1936 Summer Olympics but did not compete at the games due to his illness. In this game, he ran 10,000 metres, but his record is unknown. He was known for performance at Hakone Ekiden races as a member of the Nippon University team.

During the Pacific War, he was killed in action in the South China Sea.

Notes

References

1914 births
1945 deaths
Japanese male long-distance runners
Japanese male marathon runners
Athletes (track and field) at the 1936 Summer Olympics
Olympic athletes of Japan
World record setters in athletics (track and field)
Nihon University alumni
Japanese military personnel killed in World War II
Japanese military personnel of World War II